Claire Machin is a British actress, best known for her work in musical theatre.

Career
At the age of 16, Machin trained at Sylvia Young Theatre School, taking part in an adult drama course. Through the 1990s and early 2000s she appeared in the ensemble of several major West End shows including roles in Les Misérables, Oliver! and My Fair Lady. She took part in workshops for the stage adaptation of Mary Poppins and in 2004 was part of the original cast playing the role of Miss Lark, for which she appears on the Original London Cast Recording.

In 2009, Machin played Mamie Eisenhower in the UK professional premiere of First Lady Suite by Michael John LaChiusa, with the Whatsonstage.com review describing her performance as "particularly memorable".

In 2013, she played the role of Mabel in the Chichester Festival Theatre production of The Pajama Game. The production then transferred to the West End at the Shaftesbury Theatre from May to September 2014. In 2014, she originated the role of Gladys in the West End production of Memphis, for which she was nominated for the Whatsonstage.com Awards for Best Supporting Actress in a Musical.

In 2016, Machin played the role of Alice Beane in Titanic at the Charing Cross Theatre. She received great acclaim for this role, with reviews describing her as a "standout" and "firm audience favourite".

In 2017, Machin played the role of Cora in the West End production of The Girls, a role which she had previously played when the production premiered at the Grand Theatre, Leeds and The Lowry, Salford. For this role she was nominated for a Laurence Olivier Award for Best Actress in a Musical alongside fellow cast members Joanna Riding, Claire Moore, Sophie-Louise Dann, Debbie Chazen and Michelle Dotrice.

In 2019, she played a number of roles in the UK premiere of the Michel Legrand Broadway musical Amour at the off-West End Charing Cross Theatre, followed by the role of Mrs Brill in the major West End revival of Mary Poppins which re-united Machin with her ‘The Girls’ co-star Claire Moore. The production was halted mid-run on 16 March 2020 due to COVID-19.

Musical stage credits

References

Living people
English stage actresses
English musical theatre actresses
Year of birth missing (living people)